Derrick Shane Cullors (born December 26, 1972) is a former American football player in the National Football League.  He was with the New England Patriots for 4 years, as a runningback and kick returner. 

While only rushing for 149 yards in his entire career Cullors did play a significant role for the Patriots during the 1997-98 NFL playoffs. With star running back Curtis Martin injured he helped lead the Patriots to victory over the Miami Dolphins during the Wildcard round. On a pivotal drive in the 3rd quarter, the first sustained scoring drive for either team, he contributed by carrying the ball 7 times for 42 yards, which ended in a field goal to give the Patriots a 17-0 lead. They would go on to win 17-3 as Cullors ended up being the game's leading rusher with 86 yards on 22 carries.

In 1998, he finished tied for third in the AFC, with 1085 yards on 45 returns.  Cullors scored his lone NFL touchdown on a pass from Drew Bledsoe during a Week 13 victory over the Buffalo Bills in 1998. 

1972 births
Living people
People from Dallas
American football running backs
TCU Horned Frogs football players
New England Patriots players
Murray State Racers football players